Sir Turlough Lynagh O'Neill (Irish: Sir Toirdhealbhach Luineach mac Néill Chonnalaigh Ó Néill; 1532 – September, 1595) was an Irish Gaelic lord of Tír Eoghain in early modern Ireland. He was inaugurated upon Shane O’Neill’s death, becoming The O'Neill. From 1567 to 1595, Sir Turlough Luineach O'Neill was leader of the O'Neill clan, the most powerful family in Ulster, the northern province in Ireland. He was knighted in 1578.

Birth and ancestry
Turlough was born around 1530 at Seanchaisleán ('Old Castle'), close to the modern town of Newtownstewart. He was the fourth son of Niall Connellagh O'Neill, tanist of Tyrone (1519–1544), and was fostered by the O'Lunaigh family of Munterluney. As tanist, Niall Connallach was designated to succeed his great-uncle Conn Bacach (1519–1559) as The O'Neill. Turlough's mother may have been Niall Connellagh's wife, Rose O'Donnell, the daughter of Manus O'Donnell, The O'Donnell of the neighbouring kingdom of Tyrconnell. Turlough was the grandson of Art Og McConn, The O'Neill (1513–1519), and was a direct descendant of Brian McNiall Roe, The O'Neill and ruler of Tír Eoghain (1238–1260).

Tanist
Turlough was tanist of his uncle Shane O'Neill. Shane and Baron Dungannon contested for the title Earl of Tyrone. In 1562, both were ordered to attend the Court in London to present their cases to Queen Elizabeth I. Shane came to London, but while Lord Dungannon was travelling from Newry to Carlingford he was killed by Turlough, almost certainly on the orders of Shane.

Turlough as O'Neill
Making professions of loyalty to the Queen of England in the year following Shane's assassination, Turlough sought to strengthen his position by alliance with the O’Donnells, MacDonnells and MacQuillans. In 1570 he killed Turlough MacSweeny in battle at Dún na Long on the Foyle. His conduct giving rise to suspicions, an expedition under The 1st Earl of Essex was sent against him, which met with such doubtful success that in 1575 a treaty was arranged by which O’Neill received extensive grants of lands and permission to employ three hundred Scottish mercenaries. A further treaty in 1578, negotiated by Lady Agnes, confirmed Turlough’s vast land holdings in Ulster, granted him a Knighthood and the British titles of Earl of Clanconnell and Baron of Clogher, for life, and allowed him to retain for life the personal army of Scottish mercenaries negotiated three years before.

Still, at the outbreak of rebellion in Munster his attitude again became menacing, and for the next few years he continued to intrigue against the English authorities through clandestine alliances with Spain and Scotland, yet he maintained virtual control of Ulster until 1593, when he was forced by poor health and military setbacks to concede power to his principal rival, Hugh, brother of Brian, whom Turlough had assassinated in 1562 during Shane O’Neill's absence at the court of Queen of England. Hugh was recognised by Turlough Luineach as captain of Tyrone, and as his Tanist, in 1593. During summer 1595 Hugh seized the last castle still held by Turlough Luineach, razed it, and drove him into the wilderness. He died between 9 and 12 September 1595, and was buried at Ardstraw, probably at the Franciscan Friary founded by his ancestors.

Turlough Luineach had successfully survived as "The O'Neill" from 1567 until 1595, a turbulent quarter century that saw the most concerted efforts by the English administration to weaken and marginalise his authority in Ulster. He is frequently depicted by contemporary English historians as a weak, drunken buffoon, but his continued survival as the O'Neill through this period speaks of his considerable skill as a ruler and of a sustained policy of successful compromise.

Patron of the Arts
Turlough Luineach has the distinction of being one of the most highly praised rulers by the Gaelic poets and musicians of his time. His father Niall Connallach had been a celebrated patron of the arts and Turlough Luineach avidly followed his example. He sheltered Uilliam Nuinseann when the poet was accused of conspiracy in the Baltinglass rebellion of 1580.

Family
His second wife, Lady Agnes Campbell, was a daughter of The 3rd Earl of Argyll. One of his daughters was married, as his second wife, to Sorley Boy MacDonnell when he was past the age of eighty years. Another daughter was married to Sir Donnell O'Donnell, a leading figure in Tyrconnell until his death at the Battle of Doire Leathan in 1590. Turlough Luineach's successor was his son Sir Arthur O'Neill, although Sir Arthur did not succeed him as head of the dynasty. During Tyrone's Rebellion, Sir Arthur initially sided with his distant cousin, The 2nd Earl of Tyrone, but then switched sides and served with Sir Henry Docwra's forces out of Derry until his death in 1600. Sir Arthur was then succeeded by his own son, Turlough O'Neill.

See also
 An sluagh sidhe so i nEamhuin?
Kings of Tir Eogain
Kings of Ailech
Cenél nEógain

References

Sources
 Proinsias Ó Conluain "Dutiful Old Knight and Formidable Foe", Dúiche Néill, No. 13, 2000, pgs. 9–48.
 Hiram Morgan, Tyrone's Rebellion, The Royal Historical Society & The Boydell Press, Woodbridge, 1993.
 H.C.Hamilton, E.G. Atkinson and R.P. Mahaffy (eds) Calendar of State Papers Ireland, 24 Vols, London, 1860–1912.

1532 births
1595 deaths
16th-century Irish people
People from County Tyrone
Irish lords
People of Elizabethan Ireland
O'Neill dynasty
Clanconnell